Bengal College of Engineering and Technology, Durgapur or BCET is a self-financing college located in West Bengal, India providing under-graduate as well as post-graduate courses in engineering and technology disciplines. It was established by SKS Educational and Social Trust in 2001. The college is affiliated with Maulana Abul Kalam Azad University of Technology and all the programmes are approved by the All India Council for Technical Education.

It is located at Bidhan Nagar, a locality in Durgapur, West Bengal.

Academics 
The institute offers seven undergraduate courses:

B.Tech. in Electronics and Communication Engineering (ECE)- 4 years [Approved intake - 120]
B.Tech. in Electrical and electronic engineering (EEE)- 4 years [Approved intake - 60]
B.Tech. in Electrical Engineering (EE)- 4 years [Approved intake - 60]
B.Tech. in Mechanical Engineering (ME)- 4 years [Approved intake - 60]
B.Tech. in Computer Science and Engineering (CSE)- 4 years [Approved intake - 180]
B.Tech. in Civil Engineering (CE)- 4 years [Approved intake - 60]
B.Tech. in Information Technology (IT)- 4 years [Approved intake - 180]

The following Postgraduate Degree Programs are offered:

Master in Business Administration- 2 years [Approved intake - 60]
Master in Computer Application- 3 years [Approved intake - 60]

See also

References

External links
Bengal College of Engineering & Technology

Colleges affiliated to West Bengal University of Technology
Private engineering colleges in India
Engineering colleges in West Bengal
Universities and colleges in Paschim Bardhaman district
Education in Durgapur, West Bengal
Educational institutions established in 2001
2001 establishments in West Bengal